Kaanchli: Life in a Slough is a 2020 Indian period drama film that was produced and directed by Dedipya Joshii, and stars Sanjay Mishra, Shikha Malhotra, Lalit Parimoo and Nareshpal Singh Chauhan. The film was co-produced by Shobha Devi and presented by Anup Jalota. It is based on a story by Vijaydan Detha, a folk-story writer from Rajasthan, India, whose stories have been adapted into many films including Shah Rukh Khan's Paheli. Kaanchli, whose theme is social welfare, tells the story of a strong, self-reliant woman's struggle for survival.

The film was released on 7 February 2020 at Carnival Cinemas, and performed well at the Indian box office for two weeks.

Plot

The film is based on a story of folklorist Vijadan Detha. Kishnu is married to a beautiful woman named Kajri, towards whom Thakur, a resident of the village, has bad intentions. Thakur asks his right-hand man Bhoja to get Kajri for him. Kajri, however, is loyal to her husband and one day attacks Thakur in self-defence. Rather than praising her, Kishnu warns Kajri to not behave in this manner with Thakur again. Heartbroken and stubborn, Kajri tries to get a reaction from her husband by entering into an extramarital affair with another man, Bhoja.  Bhoja falls in love with Kajri, which gives her the idea to test Kishnu using Bhoja just to see her husband's reaction.

Cast
 Sanjay Mishra as Bhoja
 Shikha Malhotra as Kajri
 Lalit Parimoo as Thakur
 Nareshpal Singh Chouhan as Kishnu

Production

Development 
The official announcement of the film was made in June 2018. Dedipya Joshii had been working on the script since 2008. After reading "Kenchuli" by Vijaydan Detha, he decided to make a film based on it and started writing the first draft. Dedipya was satisfied with his fourth draft and sent a copy of it to Detha, who invited Joshii to his house in Borunda, Jodhpur. Joshii stayed with Detha for few days, getting to know him personally. Detha happily gave Joshii the rights of his story '"Kenchuli"' with a compliment saying after reading the script and talking over the phone with Joshii, he had assumed he was older and experienced in filmmaking. After meeting Joshii, Detha was surprised to see an enthusiastic young man. As soon as Joshii returned to Mumbai, he started working to produce the story into a feature film. After a few days, Detha wrote an affectionate, hopeful letter to Joshii saying:

Casting 
Joshii first cast Shikha Malhotra as Kajri and then approached the in-demand actor Sanjay Mishra to play Bhoja, who accepted the offer. Later, Joshii cast Narespal Singh Chouhan as Kishnu and Lalit Parimoo as Thakur in the film.

Filming 
The principal photography of the film commenced in the November 2018 but during that time, Sanjay Mishra had to travel to the Busan International Film Festival for his forthcoming film Kaamyaab and the filming schedule of Kaanchli was postponed for a month. Filming began on 7 December 2018 in the interiors of Rajasthan, which is extremely cold at that time of the year. Filming was completed on 4 January 2019.

Release
Kaanchli had its Indian box-office release on 7 February 2020. It performed well in the first week and its distributor Carnival Cinemas decided to continue showing the film for a second week in cinemas. In December 2020, Kaanchli had its OTT release via Ultra India on 11 December 2020, and was streamed more than 10 million times in eight months.

Awards
Cinema Aajtak Achievers Award - March 2020:
Won – Best Debut (Female)

References

External links

2020 films
2020s Hindi-language films
Rajasthani-language films
Indian drama films
2020 drama films
Indian historical drama films
Films set in Rajasthan
Films shot in Rajasthan
Films about women in India
Films based on short fiction